This is a list of CEN Technical Committees.

The European Committee for Standardization (CEN) is one of three European standardisation organisations in the European Union, listed in ANNEX I of the Regulation (EU) No 1025/2012. Within the CEN, standards are drafted by Technical Committees (TCs) of particular scope on the basis of national participation by the CEN members, i.e. the National Standardization Bodies of the European Union member states and some additional European country.

The following Technical Committees exist or existed within CEN:

References

 

 
European Committee for Standardization